The Street of Dreams is an annual showcase of new homes in the Portland metropolitan area of Oregon, U.S. It is put on by the Home Builders Association of Metropolitan Portland and features high-end homes designed to showcase new designs and amenities. Started in 1976, a previous incarnation of the event was known as the Parade of Homes.

Locations

1976
With amenities such as a built-in microwave, the first Street of Dreams had houses at a price of $75,000. The event was held in the Rock Creek area north of what is now the Tanasbourne neighborhood of Hillsboro.

1980–1983
The 1980 event was held in Lake Oswego, and drew 92,000 visitors.

Overall there were 14 homes in the Jackson School area. Attendance that year was 74,000.

Attendance at the development in Tualatin in 1982 was 80,000.

The Sunburst II neighborhood of West Linn hosted the annual event in 1983, which saw attendance of 107,000 people to the 14 homes.

1994
Located near Marylhurst University in Lake Oswego, the event had 12 homes.

1996
Held in the Forest Heights neighborhood of Northwest Portland, the homes had a top price of $900,000.

1998
In what is now Beaverton, the development had nine residences located on Cooper Mountain.

2000–2001
2000 had an average price of $915,000 for the seven houses. It was located near Happy Valley on Mount Scott.

The 2001 event included nine homes in the Fishback Creek neighborhood in Hillsboro.

2006
Held at the Hidden Lake Estates in Oregon City.

2017–2018

With five homes, the 2017 event was located in Happy Valley in the Mitchell Park area. It featured a home designed by Japanese architect Kengo Kuma.

Located in the South Hillsboro development, the 2018 event featured six homes adjacent to The Reserve Vineyards and Golf Club. The homes were the first built in the South Hillsboro community. The development also included a tiny home that was auctioned off for charity.

References

1976 establishments in Oregon
Annual events in Oregon
Houses in Oregon